The Spanish Empire, also known as the Hispanic Monarchy or the Catholic Monarchy was a colonial empire governed by Spain and its predecessor states between 1492 and 1976. One of the largest empires in history, it was, in conjunction with the Portuguese Empire, the first to usher the European Age of Discovery and achieve a global scale, controlling vast portions of the Americas, Africa, various islands in Asia and Oceania, as well as territory in other parts of Europe. It was one of the most powerful empires of the early modern period, becoming known as "the empire on which the sun never sets". It reached its maximum extent in the 18th century.

An important element in the formation of Spain's empire was the dynastic union between Isabella I of Castile and Ferdinand II of Aragon in 1469, known as the Catholic Monarchs, which initiated political, religious and social cohesion but not political unification. Castile (formed in 1230 from the Kingdom of Leon and the Kingdom of Asturias) became the dominant kingdom in Iberia because of its jurisdiction over the overseas empire in the Americas. The structure of the empire was further defined under the Spanish Habsburgs (1516–1700), and under the Spanish Bourbon monarchs, the empire was brought under greater crown control and increased its revenues from the Indies. The crown's authority in the Indies was enlarged by the papal grant of powers of patronage, giving it power in the religious sphere.

In the beginning, Portugal was the only serious threat to Spanish hegemony in the New World. To end the threat of Portuguese expansion, Spain invaded its Iberian neighbour in 1580, defeating Portuguese, French, and English forces. After the Spanish victory in the War of the Portuguese Succession, Philip II of Spain obtained the Portuguese crown in 1581, and Portugal and its overseas territories came under his rule with the so-called Iberian Union, considered by many historians as a Spanish conquest. Phillip respected a certain degree of autonomy in its Iberian territories and, together with the other peninsular councils, established the Council of Portugal, which oversaw Portugal and its empire and "preserv[ed] its own laws, institutions, and monetary system, and united only in sharing a common sovereign." In 1640, while Spain was fighting in Catalonia, Italy, Germany, and the Netherlands, Portugal revolted and re-established its independence under the House of Braganza. Iberian kingdoms retained their political identities, with particular administration and juridical configurations. Although the power of the Spanish sovereign as monarch varied from one territory to another, the monarch acted as such in a unitary manner over all the ruler's territories through a system of councils: the unity did not mean uniformity.

The Spanish empire also included European territories, of which the Spanish Netherlands were the richest. Following the Italian Wars against France, which concluded in 1559, Spain gained control over half of Italy (Kingdom of Naples, Sicily, Sardinia, Duchy of Milan) with the Treaty of Cateau-Cambresis. These territories remained under Spanish rule until the War of the Spanish Succession.

The Spanish empire in the Americas was formed after conquering indigenous people and claiming large stretches of land, beginning with Christopher Columbus in the Caribbean Islands. In the 16th century, the Spanish empire conquered and incorporated the Aztec and Inca empires, retaining indigenous elites loyal to the Spanish crown and converts to Christianity as intermediaries between their communities and royal government. After a short period of delegation of authority by the crown in the Americas, the crown asserted control over those territories and established the Council of the Indies to oversee rule there. The crown then established viceroyalties in the two main areas of settlement, New Spain and Peru, both regions of dense indigenous populations and mineral wealth. The Maya were finally conquered in 1697. The Magellan-Elcano circumnavigation—the first circumnavigation of the Earth—laid the foundation for Spain's Pacific empire and for Spanish control over the East Indies.

The structure of governance of its overseas empire was significantly reformed in the late 18th century by the Bourbon monarchs. Although the crown attempted to keep its empire a closed economic system under Habsburg rule, Spain was unable to supply the Indies with sufficient consumer goods to meet demand. This allowed foreign merchants from Genoa, France, England, Germany, and the Netherlands to take advantage of the trade, with silver from the mines of Peru and Mexico flowing to other parts of Europe. The merchant guild of Seville (later Cadiz) served as middlemen in the trade. The crown's trade monopoly was broken early in the 17th century, with the crown colluding with the merchant guild for fiscal reasons in circumventing the supposedly closed system. Spain was largely able to defend its territories in the Americas, with the Dutch, English, and French taking only small Caribbean islands and outposts, using them to engage in contraband trade with the Spanish populace in the Indies.

Spain experienced its greatest territorial losses during the early 19th century, when its colonies in the Americas began fighting their wars of independence. By 1900, Spain had also lost its colonies in the Caribbean and Pacific, and it was left with only its African possessions. In Latin America, among the legacies of its relationship with Iberia, Spanish is the dominant language, Catholicism the main religion, and political traditions of representative government can be traced to the Spanish Constitution of 1812.

Catholic Monarchs and origins of the empire 

With the marriage of the heirs apparent to their respective thrones Ferdinand of Aragon and Isabella of Castile created a personal union that most scholars view as the foundation of the Spanish monarchy. The union of the Crowns of Castile and Aragon joined the economic and military power of Iberia under one dynasty, the House of Trastamara. Their dynastic alliance was important for a number of reasons, ruling jointly over a number of kingdoms and other territories, mostly in the eastern mediterranean region, under their respective legal and administrative status. They successfully pursued expansion in Iberia in the Christian conquest of the Muslim Emirate of Granada, completed in 1492, for which Valencia-born Pope Alexander VI gave them the title of the Catholic Monarchs. Ferdinand of Aragon was particularly concerned with expansion in France and Italy, as well as conquests in North Africa.

The concept of 'Early Modern Spain' as a subject of study is muddled. The composite monarchy of the Hapsburgs had no official name. In the Early Modern period, as a geographical (non-political) concept and following the medieval tradition, the term 'Spain' could refer to the entire Iberian Peninsula. The term 'Catholic Monarchy' (Spanish: Monarquía Católica, already mentioned in a 1494 papal bull) was common during the reign of Holy Roman Emperor Charles V, insofar as the regime strived towards the realization of the idea of universal (that is, Catholic) monarchy. Later in time, other denominations such as 'Spanish Monarchy' (Spanish: Monarquía Española) or 'Monarchy of Spain' (Spanish: Monarquía de España, already mentioned in 1597) would also become common to refer to the composite monarchy. The official intitulation of the monarchs made no mention to monarchies nor crowns, but focused on the inherited kingdoms and other possessions.

With the Ottoman Turks controlling the choke points of the overland trade from Asia and the Middle East, both Spain and Portugal sought alternative routes. The Kingdom of Portugal had an advantage over the Crown of Castile, having earlier retaken territory from the Muslims.  Following Portugal's earlier completion of the reconquest and its establishment of settled boundaries, it began to seek overseas expansion, first to the port of Ceuta (1415) and then by colonizing the Atlantic islands of Madeira (1418) and the Azores (1427–1452); it also began voyages down the west coast of Africa in the fifteenth century. Its rival Castile laid claim to the Canary Islands (1402) and retook territory from the Moors in 1462. The Christian rivals Castile and Portugal came to formal agreements over the division of new territories in the Treaty of Alcaçovas (1479), as well as securing the crown of Castile for Isabella whose accession was challenged militarily by Portugal.

Following the voyage of Christopher Columbus in 1492 and first major settlement in the New World in 1493, Portugal and Castile divided the world by the Treaty of Tordesillas (1494), which gave Portugal Africa and Asia and the Western Hemisphere to Spain. The voyage of Columbus, a Genoese mariner, obtained the support of Isabella of Castile, sailing west in 1492, seeking a route to the Indies. Columbus unexpectedly encountered the western hemisphere, populated by peoples he named "Indians". Subsequent voyages and full-scale settlements of Spaniards followed, with gold beginning to flow into Castile's coffers. Managing the expanding empire became an administrative issue. The reign of Ferdinand and Isabella began the professionalization of the apparatus of government in Spain, which led to a demand for men of letters (letrados) who were university graduates (licenciados), of Salamanca, Valladolid, Complutense and Alcalá. These lawyer-bureaucrats staffed the various councils of state, eventually including the Council of the Indies and Casa de Contratación, the two highest bodies in metropolitan Spain for the government of the empire in the New World, as well as royal government in The Indies.

Early expansion

Fall of Granada

During the last 250 years of the Reconquista era, the Castilian monarchy tolerated the small Moorish taifa client-kingdom of Granada in the south-east by exacting tributes of gold—the parias.  In so doing, they ensured that gold from the Niger region of Africa entered Europe.

When King Ferdinand and Queen Isabella I captured Granada in 1492, they implemented policies to maintain control of the territory. To do so, the monarchy implemented a system of encomienda. Encomienda was a method of land control and distribution based upon vassalic ties. Land would be granted to a noble family, who were then responsible for farming and defending it. This eventually led to a large land based aristocracy, a separate ruling class that the crown later tried to eliminate in its overseas colonies. By implementing this method of political organization, the crown was able to implement new forms of private property without completely replacing already existing systems, such as the communal use of resources. After the military and political conquest, there was an emphasis on religious conquest as well, leading to the creation of the Spanish Inquisition. Although the Inquisition was technically a part of the Catholic church, Ferdinand and Isabella formed a separate Spanish Inquisition, which led to mass expulsion of Muslims and Jews from the peninsula. This religious court system was later adopted and transported to the Americas, though they took a less effective role there due to limited jurisdiction and large territories.

Campaigns in North Africa 

With the Christian reconquest completed in the Iberian peninsula, Spain began trying to take territory in Muslim North Africa. It had conquered Melilla in 1497, and further expansionism policy in North Africa was developed during the regency of Ferdinand the Catholic in Castile, stimulated by the Cardinal Cisneros. Several towns and outposts in the North African coast were conquered and occupied by Castile: Mazalquivir (1505), Peñón de Vélez de la Gomera (1508), Oran (1509), Tunis, Bougie and Tripoli (1510). Algiers was forced to pay tribute to Castile until Ottoman intervention. On the Atlantic coast, Spain took possession of the outpost of Santa Cruz de la Mar Pequeña (1476) with support from the Canary Islands, and it was retained until 1525 with the consent of the treaty of Cintra (1509).

Navarre and struggles for Italy 

The Catholic Monarchs had developed a strategy of marriages for their children to isolate their long-time enemy: France. The Spanish princesses married the heirs of Portugal, England and the House of Habsburg. Following the same strategy, the Catholic Monarchs decided to support the Aragonese house of Naples against Charles VIII of France in the Italian Wars beginning in 1494. Ferdinand's general Gonzalo Fernández de Córdoba took over Naples after defeating the French at the Battle of Cerignola and the Battle of Garigliano in 1503. In these battles, which established the supremacy of the Spanish Tercios in European battlefields, the forces of the kings of Spain acquired a reputation for invincibility that would last until the 1643 Battle of Rocroi.

After the death of Queen Isabella in 1504, and her exclusion of Ferdinand from a further role in Castile, Ferdinand married Germaine de Foix in 1505, cementing an alliance with France. Had that couple had a surviving heir, probably the Crown of Aragon would have been split from Castile, which was inherited by Charles, Ferdinand and Isabella's grandson. Ferdinand joined the League of Cambrai against Venice in 1508. In 1511, he became part of the Holy League against France, seeing a chance at taking both Milan—to which he held a dynastic claim—and Navarre. In 1516, France agreed to a truce that left Milan in its control and recognized Spanish control of Upper Navarre, which had effectively been a Spanish protectorate following a series of treaties in 1488, 1491, 1493, and 1495.

Canary Islands 

Portugal obtained several Papal bulls that acknowledged Portuguese control over the discovered territories, but Castile also obtained from the Pope the safeguard of its rights to the Canary Islands with the bulls Romani Pontifex dated 6 November 1436 and Dominatur Dominus dated 30 April 1437. The conquest of the Canary Islands, inhabited by Guanche people, began in 1402 during the reign of Henry III of Castile, by Norman nobleman Jean de Béthencourt under a feudal agreement with the crown. The conquest was completed with the campaigns of the armies of the Crown of Castile between 1478 and 1496, when the islands of Gran Canaria (1478–1483), La Palma (1492–1493), and Tenerife (1494–1496) were subjugated.

Rivalry with Portugal 

The Portuguese tried in vain to keep secret their discovery of the Gold Coast (1471) in the Gulf of Guinea, but the news quickly caused a huge gold rush. Chronicler Pulgar wrote that the fame of the treasures of Guinea "spread around the ports of Andalusia in such way that everybody tried to go there". Worthless trinkets, Moorish textiles, and above all, shells from the Canary and Cape Verde islands were exchanged for gold, slaves, ivory and Guinea pepper.

The War of the Castilian Succession (1475–79) provided the Catholic Monarchs with the opportunity not only to attack the main source of the Portuguese power, but also to take possession of this lucrative commerce. The Crown officially organized this trade with Guinea: every caravel had to secure a government license and to pay a tax on one-fifth of their profits (a receiver of the customs of Guinea was established in Seville in 1475—the ancestor of the future and famous Casa de Contratación).

Castilian fleets fought in the Atlantic Ocean, temporarily occupying the Cape Verde islands (1476), conquering the city of Ceuta in the Tingitan Peninsula in 1476 (but retaken by the Portuguese), and even attacked the Azores islands, being defeated at Praia. The turning point of the war came in 1478, however, when a Castilian fleet sent by King Ferdinand to conquer Gran Canaria lost men and ships to the Portuguese who expelled the attack, and a large Castilian armada—full of gold—was entirely captured in the decisive Battle of Guinea.

The Treaty of Alcáçovas (4 September 1479), while assuring the Castilian throne to the Catholic Monarchs, reflected the Castilian naval and colonial defeat: "War with Castile broke out waged savagely in the Gulf [of Guinea] until the Castilian fleet of thirty-five sail was defeated there in 1478. As a result of this naval victory, at the Treaty of Alcáçovas in 1479 Castile, while retaining her rights in the Canaries, recognized the Portuguese monopoly of fishing and navigation along the whole west African coast and Portugal's rights over the Madeira, Azores and Cape Verde islands [plus the right to conquer the Kingdom of Fez ]." The treaty delimited the spheres of influence of the two countries, establishing the principle of the Mare clausum. It was confirmed in 1481 by the Pope Sixtus IV, in the papal bull Æterni regis (dated on 21 June 1481).

However, this experience would prove to be profitable for future Spanish overseas expansion, because as the Spaniards were excluded from the lands discovered or to be discovered from the Canaries southward—and consequently from the road to India around Africa—they sponsored the voyage of Columbus towards the west (1492) in search of Asia to trade in its spices, encountering the Americas instead. Thus, the limitations imposed by the Alcáçovas treaty were overcome and a new and more balanced division of the world would be reached in the Treaty of Tordesillas between both emerging maritime powers.

New World voyages and Treaty of Tordesillas 

Seven months before the treaty of Alcaçovas, King John II of Aragon died, and his son Ferdinand II of Aragon, married to Isabella I of Castile, inherited the thrones of the Crown of Aragon. The two became known as the Catholic Monarchs, with their marriage a personal union that created a relationship between the Crown of Aragon and Castile, each with their own administrations, but ruled jointly by the two monarchs.

Ferdinand and Isabella defeated the last Muslim king out of Granada in 1492 after a ten-year war. The Catholic Monarchs then negotiated with Christopher Columbus, a Genoese sailor attempting to reach Cipangu (Japan) by sailing west. Castile was already engaged in a race of exploration with Portugal to reach the Far East by sea when Columbus made his bold proposal to Isabella. In the Capitulations of Santa Fe, dated on 17 April 1492, Christopher Columbus obtained from the Catholic Monarchs his appointment as viceroy and governor in the lands already discovered and that he might discover thenceforth; thereby, it was the first document to establish an administrative organization in the Indies. Columbus' discoveries began the Spanish colonization of the Americas. Spain's claim to these lands was solidified by the Inter caetera papal bull dated 4 May 1493, and Dudum siquidem on 26 September 1493, which vested the sovereignty of the territories discovered and to be discovered.

Since the Portuguese wanted to keep the line of demarcation of Alcaçovas running east and west along a latitude south of Cape Bojador, a compromise was worked out and incorporated in the Treaty of Tordesillas, dated on 7 June 1494, in which the globe was split into two hemispheres dividing Spanish and Portuguese claims. These actions gave Spain exclusive rights to establish colonies in all of the New World from north to south (later with the exception of Brazil, which Portuguese commander Pedro Alvares Cabral encountered in 1500), as well as the easternmost parts of Asia. The treaty of Tordesillas was confirmed by Pope Julius II in the bull Ea quae pro bono pacis on 24 January 1506.

The treaty of Tordesillas and the treaty of Cintra (18 September 1509) established the limits of the Kingdom of Fez for Portugal, and the Castilian expansion was allowed outside these limits, beginning with the conquest of Melilla in 1497.

In 1494, Columbus launched the transatlantic slave trade, sending at least twenty-four enslaved Taínos to Spain.

Papal Bulls and the Americas 

Unlike the crown of Portugal, Spain had not sought papal authorization for its explorations, but with Christopher Columbus's voyage in 1492, the crown sought papal confirmation of their title to the new lands. Since the defense of Catholicism and propagation of the faith was the papacy's primary responsibility, there were a number of papal bulls promulgated that affected the powers of the crowns of Spain and Portugal in the religious sphere. Converting the inhabitants of in the newly discovered lands was entrusted by the papacy to the rulers of Portugal and Spain, through a series of papal actions. The Patronato real, or power of royal patronage for ecclesiastical positions had precedents in Iberia during the reconquest. In 1493 Pope Alexander, from the Iberian Kingdom of Valencia, issued a series of bulls. The papal bull of Inter caetera vested the government and jurisdiction of newly found lands in the kings of Castile and León and their successors. Eximiae devotionis sinceritas granted the Catholic monarchs and their successors the same rights that the papacy had granted Portugal, in particular the right of presentation of candidates for ecclesiastical positions in the newly discovered territories.

According to the Concord of Segovia of 1475, Ferdinand was mentioned in the bulls as king of Castile, and upon his death the title of the Indies was to be incorporated into the Crown of Castile. The territories were incorporated by the Catholic Monarchs as jointly held assets.

In the Treaty of Villafáfila of 1506, Ferdinand renounced not only the government of Castile in favor of his son-in-law Philip I of Castile but also the lordship of the Indies, withholding a half of the income of the kingdoms of the Indies. Joanna of Castile and Philip immediately added to their
titles the kingdoms of Indies, Islands and Mainland of the Ocean Sea. But the Treaty of Villafáfila did not hold for long because of the death of Philip; Ferdinand returned as regent of Castile and as "lord the Indies".

According to the domain granted by Papal bulls and the wills of queen Isabella of Castile in 1504 and king Ferdinand of Aragon in 1516, such property became held by the Crown of Castile. This arrangement was ratified by successive monarchs, beginning with Charles I in 1519 in a decree that spelled out the juridical status of the new overseas territories.

The lordship of the discovered territories conveyed by papal bulls was private to the kings of Castile and León. The political condition of the Indies were to transform from "Lordship" of the Catholic Monarchs to "Kingdoms" for the heirs of Castile. Although the Alexandrine Bulls gave full, free and omnipotent power to the Catholic Monarchs, they did not rule them as a private property but as a public property through the public bodies and authorities from Castile, and when those territories were incorporated into the Crown of Castile the royal power was subject to the laws of Castile.

The crown was the guardian of levies for the support of the Catholic Church, in particular the tithe, which was levied on the products of agriculture and ranching. In general, Indians were exempt from the tithe. Although the crown received these revenues, they were to be used for the direct support of the ecclesiastical hierarchy and pious establishments, so that the crown itself did not benefit financially from this income. The crown's obligation to support the Church sometimes resulted in funds from the royal treasury being transferred to the Church when the tithes fell short of paying ecclesiastical expenses.

In New Spain, the Franciscan Bishop of Mexico Juan de Zumárraga and the first viceroy Don Antonio de Mendoza established an institution in 1536 to train natives for ordination to the priesthood, the Colegio de Santa Cruz de Tlatelolco. The experiment was deemed a failure, with the natives considered too new in the faith to be ordained. Pope Paul III did issue a bull, Sublimis Deus (1537), declaring that natives were capable of becoming Christians, but Mexican (1555) and Peruvian (1567–68) provincial councils banned natives from ordination.

North American exploration

During the 1500s, the Spanish began to explore and colonize North America. They were looking for gold in native kingdoms. By 1511 there were rumours of undiscovered lands to the northwest of Hispaniola. Juan Ponce de León equipped three ships with at least 200 men at his own expense and set out from Puerto Rico on 4 March 1513 to Florida and surrounding coastal area. Another early motive was the search for the Seven Cities of Gold, or "Cibola", rumoured to have been built by Native Americans somewhere in the desert Southwest. In 1536 Francisco de Ulloa, the first documented European to reach the Colorado River, sailed up the Gulf of California and a short distance into the river's delta.

In the year 1524 the Portuguese Estevão Gomes, who'd sailed in Ferdinand Magellan's fleet, explored Nova Scotia, sailing South through Maine, where he entered New York Harbor, the Hudson River and eventually reached Florida in August 1525.

The Spaniard Álvar Núñez Cabeza de Vaca was the leader of the Narváez expedition of 600 men, that between 1527 and 1535 explored the mainland of North America. From Tampa Bay, Florida on 15 April 1528, they marched through Florida. Traveling mostly on foot, they crossed Texas, New Mexico and Arizona, and Mexican states of Tamaulipas, Nuevo León and Coahuila. After several months of fighting native inhabitants through wilderness and swamp, the party reached Apalachee Bay with 242 men. They believed they were near other Spaniards in Mexico, but there was in fact 1500 miles of coast between them. They followed the coast westward, until they reached the mouth of the Mississippi River near to Galveston Island. Later they were enslaved for a few years by various Native American tribes of the upper Gulf Coast. They continued through Coahuila and Nueva Vizcaya; then down the Gulf of California coast to what is now Sinaloa, Mexico, over a period of roughly eight years. They spent years enslaved by the Ananarivo of the Louisiana Gulf Islands. Later they were enslaved by the Hans, the Capoques and others. In 1534 they escaped into the American interior, contacting other Native American tribes along the way. Only four men, Cabeza de Vaca, Andrés Dorantes de Carranza, Alonso del Castillo Maldonado, and an enslaved Moroccan Berber named Estevanico, survived and escaped to reach Mexico City. In 1539, Estevanico was one of four men who accompanied Marcos de Niza as a guide in search of the fabled Seven Cities of Cibola, preceding Coronado. When the others were struck ill, Estevanico continued alone, opening up what is now New Mexico and Arizona. He was killed at the Zuni village of Hawikuh in present-day New Mexico.

The viceroy of New Spain Antonio de Mendoza, for who is named the Codex Mendoza, commissioned several expeditions to explore and establish settlements in the northern lands of New Spain in 1540–42. Francisco Vásquez de Coronado reached Quivira in central Kansas. Juan Rodríguez Cabrillo explored the western coastline of Alta California in 1542–43.

Francisco Vásquez de Coronado's 1540–42 expedition began as a search for the fabled Cities of Gold, but after learning from natives in New Mexico of a large river to the west, he sent García López de Cárdenas to lead a small contingent to find it. With the guidance of Hopi Indians, Cárdenas and his men became the first outsiders to see the Grand Canyon. However, Cárdenas was reportedly unimpressed with the canyon, assuming the width of the Colorado River at six feet (1.8 m) and estimating 300-foot (91 m)-tall rock formations to be the size of a man. After unsuccessfully attempting to descend to the river, they left the area, defeated by the difficult terrain and torrid weather.

In 1540, Hernando de Alarcón and his fleet reached the mouth of the Colorado River, intending to provide additional supplies to Coronado's expedition. Alarcón may have sailed the Colorado as far upstream as the present-day California–Arizona border. However, Coronado never reached the Gulf of California, and Alarcón eventually gave up and left. Melchior Díaz reached the delta in the same year, intending to establish contact with Alarcón, but the latter was already gone by the time of Díaz's arrival. Díaz named the Colorado River Rio del Tizon, while the name Colorado ("Red River") was first applied to a tributary of the Gila River.

In 1540, expeditions under Hernando de Alarcon and Melchior Diaz visited the area of Yuma and immediately saw the natural crossing of the Colorado River from Mexico to California by land, as an ideal spot for a city, as the Colorado River narrows to slightly under 1000 feet wide in one small point. Later military expedition that crossed the Colorado River at the Yuma Crossing include Juan Bautista de Anza (1774).

In 1541, Hernando De Soto became the first explorer to cross the Mississippi River. During this expedition, the Spanish fought Utina tribesmen in Florida, Chickasaws in Mississippi, the Coosa chiefdom in present-day Georgia, and Chief Tuskaloosa at the Battle of Mabila in present-day Alabama.

The Chamuscado and Rodríguez Expedition explored New Mexico in 1581–82. They explored a part of the route visited by Coronado in New Mexico and other parts in the southwestern United States between 1540 and 1542.

The viceroy of New Spain Don Diego García Sarmiento sent another expedition in 1648 to explore, conquer and colonize the Californias.

First settlements in the Americas 

With the Capitulations of Santa Fe, the Crown of Castile granted expansive power to Christopher Columbus, including exploration, settlement, political power, and revenues, with sovereignty reserved to the Crown. The first voyage established sovereignty for the crown, and the crown acted on the assumption that Columbus's grandiose assessment of what he found was true, so Spain negotiated the Treaty of Tordesillas with Portugal to protect their territory on the Spanish side of the line. The crown fairly quickly reassessed its relationship with Columbus and moved to assert more direct crown control over the territory and extinguish his privileges. With that lesson learned, the crown was far more prudent in the specifying the terms of exploration, conquest, and settlement in new areas.

The pattern in the Caribbean that played out over the larger Spanish Indies was exploration of an unknown area and claim of sovereignty for the crown; conquest of indigenous peoples or assumption of control without direct violence; settlement by Spaniards who were awarded the labour of indigenous people via the encomienda; and the existing settlements becoming the launch point for further exploration, conquest, and settlement, followed by the establishment institutions with officials appointed by the crown. The patterns set in the Caribbean were replicated throughout the expanding Spanish sphere, so although the importance of the Caribbean quickly faded after the Spanish conquest of the Aztec Empire and the Spanish conquest of the Inca Empire, many of those participating in those conquests had started their exploits in the Caribbean.

The first permanent European settlements in the New World were established in the Caribbean, initially on the island of Hispaniola, later Cuba, Jamaica and Puerto Rico. As a Genoese with the connections to Portugal, Columbus considered settlement to be on the pattern of trading forts and factories, with salaried employees to trade with locals and to identify exploitable resources. However, Spanish settlement in the New World was based on a pattern of a large, permanent settlements with the entire complex of institutions and material life to replicate Castilian life in a different venue. Columbus's second voyage in 1493 had a large contingent of settlers and goods to accomplish that. Columbus established the fort of La Navidad in present-day Haiti; it was later destroyed by the Taínos and the Spanish garrison was wiped out.

On Hispaniola, the city of Santo Domingo was founded in 1496 by Christopher Columbus's brother Bartholomew Columbus and became a stone-built, permanent city. Non-Castilians such as Catalans and Aragonese were often forbidden to migrate to the New World. In 1508, the crown's attention shifted from Hispaniola to Cuba, where a major expedition was launched in 1511 under the leadership of Diego Velázquez de Cuéllar. The invading Castilians slaughtered thousands of Taíno Indians. By 1515, the conquest of Cuba was complete.

Some scholars have described the initial period of the Spanish conquest of America, from 1492 until the mid 16th century, as the largest case of genocide in history, with millions of indigenous people dying from imported Eurasia diseases that travelled more quickly than the Spanish conquerors. The death toll is estimated as high as 70 million out of a population of 80 million during this period. Diseases killed between 50% and 95% of the indigenous population. Some scholars attribute the vast majority of indigenous deaths due to the low immunological capacity of native populations to resist exogenous diseases.

Assertion of Crown control in the Americas
Although Columbus staunchly asserted and believed that the lands he encountered were in Asia, the paucity of material wealth and the relative lack of complexity of indigenous society meant that the Crown of Castile initially was not concerned with the extensive powers granted Columbus. As the Caribbean became a draw for Spanish settlement and as Columbus and his extended Genoese family failed to be recognized as officials worthy of the titles they held, there was unrest among Spanish settlers. The crown began to curtail the expansive powers that they had granted Columbus, first by appointment of royal governors and then a high court or Audiencia in 1511.

Columbus encountered the mainland in 1498, and the Catholic Monarchs learned of his discovery in May 1499. Taking advantage of a revolt against Columbus in Hispaniola, they appointed Francisco de Bobadilla as governor of the Indies with civil and criminal jurisdiction over the lands discovered by Columbus. Bobadilla, however, was soon replaced by Frey Nicolás de Ovando in September 1501. Henceforth, the Crown would authorize to individuals voyages to discover territories in the Indies only with previous royal license, and after 1503 the monopoly of the Crown was assured by the establishment of the Casa de Contratación (House of Trade) at Seville. The successors of Columbus, however, litigated against the Crown until 1536 for the fulfillment of the Capitulations of Santa Fe in the pleitos colombinos.

In metropolitan Spain, the direction of the Americas was taken over by the Bishop Fonseca between 1493 and 1516, and again between 1518 and 1524, after a brief period of rule by Jean le Sauvage. After 1504 the figure of the secretary was added, so between 1504 and 1507 Gaspar de Gricio took charge, between 1508 and 1518 Lope de Conchillos followed him, and from 1519, Francisco de los Cobos.

In 1511, the Junta of The Indies was constituted as a standing committee belonging to the Council of Castile to address issues of the Indies, and this junta constituted the origin of the Council of the Indies, established in 1524. That same year, the crown established a permanent high court, or audiencia, in the most important city at the time, Santo Domingo, on the island of Hispaniola (now Haiti and the Dominican Republic). Now oversight of the Indies was based both in Castile and with officials of the new royal court in the colony. As new areas were conquered and significant Spanish settlements were established, likewise other audiencias were established.

Following the settlement of Hispaniola, Europeans began searching elsewhere to begin new settlements, since there was little apparent wealth and the numbers of indigenous were declining. Those from the less prosperous Hispaniola were eager to search for new success in a new settlement. From there Juan Ponce de León conquered Puerto Rico (1508) and Diego Velázquez took Cuba.

In 1508, the Board of Navigators met in Burgos and concurred on the need to establish settlements on the mainland, a project entrusted to Alonso de Ojeda and Diego de Nicuesa as governors. They were subordinated to the governor of Hispaniola, the newly appointed Diego Columbus, with the same legal authority as Ovando.

The first settlement on the mainland was Santa María la Antigua del Darién in Castilla de Oro (now Nicaragua, Costa Rica, Panama and Colombia), settled by Vasco Núñez de Balboa in 1510. In 1513, Balboa crossed the Isthmus of Panama, and led the first European expedition to see the Pacific Ocean from the West coast of the New World. In an action with enduring historical import, Balboa claimed the Pacific Ocean and all the lands adjoining it for the Spanish Crown.

The judgment of Seville of May 1511 recognized the viceregal title to Diego Columbus, but limited it to Hispaniola and to the islands discovered by his father, Christopher Columbus; his power was nevertheless limited by royal officers and magistrates constituting a dual regime of government. The crown separated the territories of the mainland, designated as Castilla de Oro, from the viceroy of Hispaniola, establishing Pedrarias Dávila as General Lieutenant in 1513 with functions similar to those of a viceroy, while Balboa remained but was subordinated as governor of Panama and Coiba on the Pacific Coast; after his death, they returned to Castilla de Oro. The territory of Castilla de Oro did not include Veragua (which was comprised approximately between the Chagres River and cape Gracias a Dios), as it was subject to a lawsuit between the Crown and Diego Columbus, or the region farther north, towards the Yucatán peninsula, explored by Yáñez Pinzón and Solís in 1508–1509, due to its remoteness. The conflicts of the viceroy Columbus with the royal officers and with the Audiencia, created in Santo Domingo in 1511, caused his return to the Peninsula in 1515.

The Spanish Habsburgs (1516–1700) 

As a result of the marriage politics of the Catholic Monarchs (in Spanish), their Habsburg grandson Charles inherited the Castilian empire in America and the possessions of the Crown of Aragon in the Mediterranean (including all of south Italy), lands in Germany, the Low Countries, Franche-Comté, and Austria, starting the Spanish Habsburgs rule in Spain. The latter and the rest of the hereditary Habsburg domains were transferred to Ferdinand, the Emperor's brother, whereas Spain and the remaining possessions were inherited by Charles's son, Philip II of Spain, at the abdication of the former in 1556.

The Habsburgs pursued several goals:
 Undermining the power of France and containing it in its eastern borders
 Defending Europe against Islam, notably the Ottoman Empire in the Ottoman–Habsburg wars
 Maintaining Habsburg hegemony in the Holy Roman Empire and defending the Roman Catholic Church against the Protestant Reformation
 Spreading (Catholic) Christianity to the unconverted indigenous of the New World and the Philippines
 Exploiting the resources of the Americas (gold, silver, sugar) and trading with Asia (porcelain, spices, silk)
 Excluding other European powers from the possessions it claimed in the New World

"I learnt a proverb here", said a French traveler in 1603: "Everything is dear in Spain except silver". The problems caused by inflation were discussed by scholars at the School of Salamanca and the arbitristas. The natural resource abundance provoked a decline in entrepreneurship as profits from resource extraction are less risky. The wealthy preferred to invest their fortunes in public debt (juros). The Habsburg dynasty spent the Castilian and American riches in wars across Europe on behalf of Habsburg interests, and declared moratoriums (bankruptcies) on their debt payments several times. These burdens led to a number of revolts across the Spanish Habsburg's domains, including their Spanish kingdoms, but the rebellions were put down.

Imperial economic policy

The Spanish Empire benefited from favorable factor endowments in its overseas possessions with their large, exploitable, indigenous populations and rich mining areas. Given that, the crown attempted to create and maintain a classic closed mercantile system, warding off competitors and keeping wealth within the empire. While the Habsburgs were committed to maintaining a state monopoly in theory, in reality the Empire was a porous economic realm and smuggling was widespread. In the 16th and 17th century under the Habsburgs, Spain experienced a gradual decline in economic conditions, especially relative to the industrial development of its French, Dutch, and English rivals. Many of the goods being exported to the Empire originated from manufacturers in northwest Europe, rather than in Spain. But illicit commercial activities became a part of the Empire's administrative structure. Supported by large flows of silver from America, trade prohibited by Spanish mercantilist trade restrictions flourished, because it provided a source of income to both crown officials and private merchants. The local administrative structure in Buenos Aires, for example, was established through its oversight of both legal and illegal commerce. The crown's pursuit of wars to maintain and expand territory, defend the Catholic faith and stamp out Protestantism, and beat back Ottoman Turkish strength outstripped its ability to pay for it all, despite the huge production of silver in Peru and Mexico. Most of that flow paid mercenary soldiers in the European religious wars in the sixteenth and seventeenth centuries and into foreign merchants' hands to pay for the consumer goods manufactured in northern Europe. Paradoxically the wealth of the Indies impoverished Spain and enriched northern Europe, a course the Bourbon monarchs would later attempt to reverse in the eighteenth century.

This was well recognized in Spain, with writers on political economy, the arbitristas sending the crown lengthy analyses in the form of "memorials, of the perceived problems and with proposed solutions." According to these thinkers, "Royal expenditure must be regulated, the sale of office halted, the growth of the church checked. The tax system must be overhauled, special concessions be made to agricultural laborers, rivers be made navigable and dry lands irrigated. In this way alone could Castile's productivity increased, its commerce restored, and its humiliating dependence on foreigners, on the Dutch and the Genoese, be brought to an end."

From the early days of the Caribbean and conquest era, the crown attempted to control trade between Spain and the Indies with restrictive policies enforced by the House of Trade (est. 1503) in Seville. Shipping was through particular ports in Spain (Seville, subsequently Cadiz), Spanish America (Veracruz, Acapulco, Havana, Cartagena de Indias, and Callao/Lima) and the Philippines (Manila). Spanish settlers in the Indies in the very early period were few and Spain could supply sufficient goods to them. But as the Aztec and Inca empires were conquered in the early sixteenth century and then large deposits of silver found in both Mexico and Peru, the regions of those major empires, Spanish immigration increased and demand for goods rose far beyond Spain's ability to supply it. Since Spain had little capital to invest in the expanding trade and no significant commercial group, bankers and commercial houses in Genoa, Germany, The Netherlands, France, and England supplied both investment capital and goods in a supposedly closed system. Even in the sixteenth century, Spain recognized that the idealized closed system did not function in reality. Despite that the crown did not alter its restrictive structure or advocacy of fiscal prudence, despite the pleas of the arbitristas, the Indies trade remained nominally in the hands of Spain, but in fact enriched the other European countries.

The crown established the system of treasure fleets to protect the conveyance of silver to Seville (later Cadiz). Merchants in Seville conveyed consumer goods that were registered and taxed by the House of Trade were sent to the Indies were produced in other European countries. Other European commercial interests came to dominate supply, with Spanish merchant houses and their guilds (consulados) in Spain and the Indies acting as mere middlemen, reaping profits a slice of the profits. However, those profits did not promote Spanish economic development of a manufacturing sector, with its economy continuing to be based on agriculture. The wealth of the Indies led to prosperity in northern Europe, particularly The Netherlands and England, both Protestant. As Spain's power weakened in the seventeenth century, England, The Netherlands, and the French took advantage overseas by seizing islands in the Caribbean, which became bases for a burgeoning contraband trade in Spanish America. Crown officials who were supposed to suppress contraband trade were quite often in cahoots with the foreigners, since it was a source of personal enrichment. In Spain, the crown itself participated in collusion with foreign merchant houses, since they paid fines, "meant to establish a compensation to the state for losses through fraud." it became for merchant houses a calculated risk for doing business; for the crown it gained income it would have lost otherwise. Foreigner merchants were part of the supposed monopoly system of trade. The transfer of the House of Trade from Seville to Cadiz meant even easier access of foreign merchant houses to the Spanish trade.

The motor of the Spanish imperial economy that had a global impact was silver mining. The mines in Peru and Mexico were in the hands of a few elite mining entrepreneurs, with access to capital and a stomach for the risk mining entailed. They operated under a system of royal licensing, since the crown held the rights to subsoil wealth. Mining entrepreneurs assumed all the risk of the enterprise, while the crown gained a 20% slice of the profits, the royal fifth ("Quinto"). Further adding to the crown's revenues was mining was that it crown held a monopoly on the supply of mercury, used for separating pure silver from silver ore in the patio process. The crown kept the price high, thereby depressing the volume of silver production. Protecting its flow from Mexico and Peru as it transited to ports for shipment to Spain resulted early on in a convoy system (the flota) sailing twice a year. Its success can be judged by the fact that the silver fleet was captured only once, in 1628 by Dutch privateer Piet Hein. That loss resulted in the bankruptcy of the Spanish crown and an extended period of economic depression in Spain.

One practice used by the Spanish to gather workers for the mines was called repartimiento. This was a rotational forced labor system where indigenous pueblos were obligated to send laborers to work in Spanish mines and plantations for a set number of days out of the year. Repartimiento was not implemented to replace slave labor but instead existed alongside free wage labor, slavery, and indentured labor. It was, however, a way for the Spanish to procure cheap labor thus boosting the mining-driven economy. It is important to note that the men who worked as repartimiento laborers were not always resistant to the practice. Some were drawn to the labor as a way to supplement the wages they earned cultivating fields so as to support their families and, of course, pay tributes. At first, a Spaniard could get repartimiento laborers to work for them with permission from a crown official, such as a viceroy, only on the basis that this labor was absolutely necessary to provide the country with important resources. This condition became laxer as the years went on and various enterprises had repartimiento laborers where they would work in dangerous conditions for long hours and low wages.

During the Bourbon era, economic reforms sought to reverse the pattern that left Spain impoverished with no manufacturing sector and its colonies' need for manufactured goods supplied by other nations. It attempted to restructure to establish as closed trading system, but it was hampered by the terms of the 1713 Treaty of Utrecht. The treaty ending the War of the Spanish Succession with a victory for the Bourbon French candidate for the throne had a provision for British merchants to legally sell by a license (Asiento de Negros) slaves to Spanish America. The provision undermined the possibility of a revamped Spanish monopoly system. The merchants also used the opportunity to engage in contraband trade of their manufactured goods. Crown policy sought to make legal trade more appealing than contraband by instituting free commerce (comercio libre) in 1778 whereby Spanish American ports could trade with each other and they could trade with any port in Spain. It was aimed at revamping a closed Spanish system and outflanking the increasingly powerful British. Silver production revived in the eighteenth century, with production far surpassing the earlier output. The crown reducing the taxes on mercury, meaning that a greater volume of pure silver could be refined. Silver mining absorbed most available capital in Mexico and Peru, and the crown emphasized the production of precious metals that was sent to Spain. There was some economic development in the Indies to supply food, but a diversified economy did not emerge. The economic reforms of the Bourbon era both shaped and were themselves impacted by geopolitical developments in Europe. The Bourbon Reforms arose out of the War of the Spanish Succession. In turn, the crown's attempt to tighten its control over its colonial markets in the Americas led to further conflict with other European powers who were vying for access to them. After a sparking a series of skirmishes throughout the 1700s over its stricter policies, Spain's reformed trade system led to war with Britain in 1796. In the Americas, meanwhile, economic policies enacted under the Bourbons had different impacts in different regions. On one hand, silver production in New Spain greatly increased and led to economic growth. But much of the profits of the revitalized mining sector went to mining elites and state officials, while in rural areas of New Spain conditions for rural workers deteriorated, contributing to social unrest that would impact subsequent revolts.

Pacific exploration and trade 
In 1525, King Charles I of Spain ordered an expedition led by friar García Jofre de Loaísa to go to Asia by the western route to colonize the Maluku Islands (known as Spice Islands, now part of Indonesia), thus crossing first the Atlantic and then the Pacific oceans. Ruy López de Villalobos sailed to the Philippines in 1542–43. From 1546 to 1547 Francis Xavier worked in Maluku among the peoples of Ambon Island, Ternate, and Morotai, and laid the foundations for the Christian religion there.

In 1564, Miguel López de Legazpi was commissioned by the viceroy of New Spain, Luis de Velasco, to explore the Maluku Islands where Magellan and Ruy López de Villalobos had landed in 1521 and 1543, respectively. The expedition was ordered by King Philip II of Spain, after whom the Philippines had earlier been named by Villalobos. El Adelantado Legazpi established settlements in the East Indies and the Pacific Islands in 1565. He was the first governor-general of the Spanish East Indies. After obtaining peace with various indigenous tribes, López de Legazpi made Manila the capital in 1571.

The Spanish settled and took control of Tidore in 1603 to trade spices and counter Dutch encroachment in the archipelago of Maluku. The Spanish presence lasted until 1663, when the settlers and military were moved back to the Philippines. Part of the Ternatean population chose to leave with the Spanish, settling near Manila in what later became the municipality of Ternate.

Spanish galleons travelled across the Pacific Ocean annually between Acapulco in Mexico and Manila, and from there the primary Asian destination for silver from the Americas was China.

In 1542, Juan Rodríguez Cabrillo traversed the coast of California and named many of its features. In 1601, Sebastián Vizcaíno mapped the coastline in detail and gave new names to many features. Martín de Aguilar, lost from the expedition led by Sebastián Vizcaíno, explored the Pacific coast as far north as Coos Bay in present-day Oregon.

Since the 1549 arrival to Kagoshima (Kyushu) of a group of Jesuits with St. Francis Xavier missionary and Portuguese traders, Spain was interested in Japan. In this first group of Jesuit missionaries were included Spaniards Cosme de Torres and Juan Fernández.

In 1611, Sebastián Vizcaíno surveyed the east coast of Japan and from the year of 1611 to 1614 he was ambassador of King Philip III in Japan returning to Acapulco in the year of 1614. In 1608, he was sent to search for two mythical islands called Rico de Oro (island of gold) and Rico de Plata (island of silver).

Spain expanded its Pacific empire in 1668 when Jesuit missionary Diego Luis de San Vitores established a mission on Guam. San Vitores was killed by the native Chamorros in 1672, sparking the Spanish-Chamorro Wars.

The Spanish Bourbons (1700–1808) 

With the 1700 death of the childless Charles II of Spain, the crown of Spain was contested in the War of the Spanish Succession.
Under the Treaties of Utrecht (11 April 1713) ending the war, the French prince of the House of Bourbon, Philippe of Anjou, grandchild of Louis XIV of France, became the king Philip V. He retained the Spanish overseas empire in the Americas and the Philippines. The settlement gave spoils to those who had backed a Habsburg for the Spanish monarchy, ceding European territory of the Spanish Netherlands, Naples, Milan, and Sardinia to Austria; Sicily and parts of Milan to the Duchy of Savoy, and Gibraltar and Menorca to the Kingdom of Great Britain. The treaty also granted British merchants the exclusive right to sell slaves in Spanish America for thirty years, the asiento de negros, as well as licensed voyages to ports in Spanish colonial dominions and openings.

Spain's economic and demographic recovery had begun slowly in the last decades of the Habsburg reign, as was evident from the growth of its trading convoys and the much more rapid growth of illicit trade during the period. (This growth was slower than the growth of illicit trade by northern rivals in the empire's markets.) However, this recovery was not then translated into institutional improvement, rather the "proximate solutions to permanent problems." This legacy of neglect was reflected in the early years of Bourbon rule in which the military was ill-advisedly pitched into battle in the War of the Quadruple Alliance (1718–20). Spain was defeated in Italy by an alliance of Britain, France, Savoy, and Austria. Following the war, the new Bourbon monarchy took a much more cautious approach to international relations, relying on a family alliance with Bourbon France, and continuing to follow a program of institutional renewal.

The crown program to enact reforms that promoted administrative control and efficiency in the metropole to the detriment of interests in the colonies undermined creole elites' loyalty to the crown. When French forces of Napoleon Bonaparte invaded the Iberian peninsula in 1808, Napoleon ousted the Spanish Bourbon monarchy, placing his brother Joseph Bonaparte on the Spanish throne. There was a crisis of legitimacy of crown rule in Spanish America, leading to the Spanish American wars of independence (1808–1826).

Bourbon reforms 

The Spanish Bourbons' broadest intentions were to reorganize the institutions of empire to better administer it for the benefit of Spain and the crown. It sought to increase revenues and to assert greater crown control, including over the Catholic Church. Centralization of power (beginning with the Nueva Planta decrees against the realms of the Crown of Aragon) was to be for the benefit of the crown and the metropole and for the defense of its empire against foreign incursions. From the viewpoint of Spain, the structures of colonial rule under the Habsburgs were no longer functioning to the benefit of Spain, with much wealth being retained in Spanish America and going to other European powers. The presence of other European powers in the Caribbean, with the English in Barbados (1627), St Kitts (1623–25), and Jamaica (1655); the Dutch in Curaçao, and the French in Saint Domingue (Haiti) (1697), Martinique, and Guadeloupe had broken the integrity of the closed Spanish mercantile system and established thriving sugar colonies.

At the beginning of his reign, the first Spanish Bourbon, King Philip V, reorganized the government to strengthen the executive power of the monarch as was done in France, in place of the deliberative, Polysynodial System of Councils.

Philip's government set up a ministry of the Navy and the Indies (1714) and established commercial companies, the Honduras Company (1714), a Caracas company, the Guipuzcoana Company (1728), and the most successful one, the Havana Company (1740).

Cadiz became the one port for all Indies trading (see flota system). Individual sailings at regular intervals were slow to displace the traditional armed convoys, but by the 1760s there were regular ships plying the Atlantic from Cadiz to Havana and Puerto Rico, and at longer intervals to the Río de la Plata, where an additional viceroyalty was created in 1776. The contraband trade that was the lifeblood of the Habsburg empire declined in proportion to registered shipping (a shipping registry having been established in 1735).

Two upheavals registered unease within Spanish America and at the same time demonstrated the renewed resiliency of the reformed system: the Tupac Amaru uprising in Peru in 1780 and the rebellion of the comuneros of New Granada, both in part reactions to tighter, more efficient control.

18th-century economic conditions 

The 18th century was a century of prosperity for the overseas Spanish Empire as trade within grew steadily, particularly in the second half of the century, under the Bourbon reforms. Spain's victory in the Battle of Cartagena de Indias against a British expedition in the Caribbean port of Cartagena de Indias helped Spain secure its dominance of its possessions in America until the 19th century. But different regions fared differently under Bourbon rule, and even while New Spain was particularly prosperous, it was also marked by steep wealth inequality. Silver production boomed in New Spain during the 18th century, with output more than tripling between the start of the century and the 1750s. The economy and the population both grew, both centered around Mexico City. But while mine owners and the crown benefited from the flourishing silver economy, most of the population in the rural Bajío faced rising land prices, falling wages. Eviction of many from their lands resulted.

With a Bourbon monarchy came a repertory of Bourbon mercantilist ideas based on a centralized state, put into effect in America slowly at first but with increasing momentum during the century. Shipping grew rapidly from the mid-1740s until the Seven Years' War (1756–63), reflecting in part the success of the Bourbons in bringing illicit trade under control. With the loosening of trade controls after the Seven Years' War, shipping trade within the empire once again began to expand, reaching an extraordinary rate of growth in the 1780s.

The end of Cadiz's monopoly of trade with America brought about very important changes, particularly a rebirth of Spanish manufactures. Most notable of those changes were both the beginning of Catalan participation in the Spanish slave trade, and the rapidly growing textile industry of Catalonia which by the mid-1780s saw the first signs of industrialization. This saw the emergence of a small, politically active commercial class in Barcelona. This isolated pocket of advanced economic development stood in stark contrast to the relative backwardness of most of the country. Most of the improvements were in and around some major coastal cities and the major islands such as Cuba, with its tobacco plantations, and a renewed growth of precious metals mining in America.

Agricultural productivity remained low despite efforts to introduce new techniques to what was for the most part an uninterested, exploited peasant and laboring groups. Governments were inconsistent in their policies. Though there were substantial improvements by the late 18th century, Spain was still an economic backwater. Under the mercantile trading arrangements it had difficulty in providing the goods being demanded by the strongly growing markets of its empire, and providing adequate outlets for the return trade.

From an opposing point of view according to the "backwardness" mentioned above the naturalist and explorer Alexander von Humboldt traveled extensively throughout the Spanish Americas, exploring and describing it for the first time from a modern scientific point of view between 1799 and 1804. In his work Political essay on the kingdom of New Spain containing researches relative to the geography of Mexico he says that the Amerindians of New Spain were wealthier than any Russian or German peasant in Europe. According to Humboldt, despite the fact that Indian farmers were poor, under Spanish rule they were free and slavery was non-existent, their conditions were much better than any other peasant or farmer in northern Europe.

Humboldt also published a comparative analysis of bread and meat consumption in New Spain compared to other cities in Europe such as Paris. Mexico City consumed 189 pounds of meat per person per year, in comparison to 163 pounds consumed by the inhabitants of Paris, the Mexicans also consumed almost the same amount of bread as any European city, with 363 kilograms of bread per person per year in comparison to the 377 kilograms consumed in Paris. Caracas consumed seven times more meat per person than in Paris. Von Humboldt also said that the average income in that period was four times the European income and also that the cities of New Spain were richer than many European cities.

Scientific investigations and expeditions

The Spanish American Enlightenment produced a huge body of information on Spain's overseas empire via scientific expeditions. The most famous traveler in Spanish America was Prussian scientist Alexander von Humboldt, whose travel writings, especially Political Essay on the Kingdom of New Spain and scientific observations remain important sources for the history of Spanish America. Humboldt's expedition was authorized by the crown, but was self-funded from his personal fortune. The Bourbon crown promoted state-funded scientific work prior to the famous Humboldt expedition. Eighteenth-century clerics contributed to the expansion of scientific knowledge. These include José Antonio de Alzate y Ramírez, and José Celestino Mutis.

The Spanish crown funded a number of important scientific expeditions: Botanical Expedition to the Viceroyalty of Peru (1777–78); Royal Botanical Expedition to New Granada (1783–1816); the Royal Botanical Expedition to New Spain (1787–1803); which scholars are now examining afresh. Although the crown funded a number of Spanish expeditions to the Pacific Northwest to bolster claims to territory, lengthy transatlantic and transpacific Malaspina-Bustamante Expedition was for scientific purposes. The crown also funded the Balmis Expedition in 1804 to vaccinate colonial populations against smallpox.

Much of the research done in the eighteenth century was never published or otherwise disseminated, in part due to budgetary constraints on the crown. Starting in the late twentieth century, research on the history of science in Spain and the Spanish empire has blossomed, with primary sources being published in scholarly editions or reissued, as well the publication of a considerable number of important scholarly studies.

Contesting with other empires 

The Spanish empire had still not returned to first-rate power status, but it had recovered and even extended its territories considerably from the dark days at the beginning of the eighteenth century when it was, particularly in continental matters, at the mercy of other powers' political deals. The relatively more peaceful century under the new monarchy had allowed it to rebuild and start the long process of modernizing its institutions and economy, and the demographic decline of the 17th century had been reversed. It was a middle-ranking power with great power pretensions that could not be ignored. But time was to be against it.

Military recovery

Bourbon institutional reforms under Philip V bore fruit militarily when Spanish forces easily retook Naples and Sicily from the Austrians at the Battle of Bitonto in 1734 during the War of the Polish Succession, and during the War of Jenkins' Ear (1739–42) thwarted British efforts to capture the strategic cities of Cartagena de Indias and Santiago de Cuba by defeating a massive British army and navy, although Spain's invasion of Georgia also failed.

In 1742, the War of Jenkins' Ear merged with the larger War of the Austrian Succession, and King George's War in North America. The British, also occupied with France, were unable to capture Spanish convoys, and Spanish privateers captured British merchant shipping along the Triangle Trade routes and attacked the coast of North Carolina, levying tribute on the inhabitants. In Europe, Spain had been trying to divest Maria Theresa of Lombardy in northern Italy since 1741, but faced the opposition of Charles Emmanuel III of Sardinia, and warfare in northern Italy remained indecisive throughout the period up to 1746.  By the 1748 Treaty of Aix-la-Chappelle, Spain gained Parma, Piacenza, and Guastalla in northern Italy.

Spain was defeated during the invasion of Portugal and lost both Havana and Manila to British forces towards the end of the Seven Years' War (1756–63), but it promptly recovered these losses and seized British forts in West Florida and the British naval base in the Bahamas during the American Revolutionary War (1775–83).

In North Africa, Spain captured Oran from the Ottoman Empire in 1732 at the cost of only 30 killed. In 1775, Spain unsuccessfully invaded Ottoman Algiers, killing 5,000–6,000 Algerians and Turks while suffering 500 dead. In 1783 and 1784, the Spanish navy bombarded Algiers to end piracy in the Mediterranean. The second bombardment under Admiral Antonio Barceló damaged the city so severely that the Dey of Algiers negotiated a peace treaty.

During most of the 18th century, Spanish privateers, particularly from Santo Domingo, were the scourge of the Antilles, with Dutch, British, French and Danish vessels as their prizes.

Role in the American Revolution

Spain contributed to the independence of the thirteen American colonies (which formed the United States) together with France. Spain and France were allies because of the Bourbon "Family Pact" carried out by both countries against Britain.

Gibraltar was besieged for more than three years, but the British garrison stubbornly resisted and was resupplied twice: once after Admiral George Rodney's victory over Juan de Lángara in the 1780 Battle of Cape St. Vincent, and again by Admiral Richard Howe in 1782. Further Franco-Spanish efforts to capture Gibraltar were unsuccessful. One notable success took place on 5 February 1782, when the Spanish recaptured Minorca. Ambitious plans for an invasion of Britain in 1779 had to be abandoned. Admiral Luis de Córdova y Córdova captured two British convoys totaling seventy-nine ships, including a fleet of fifty-five merchantmen and frigates in the action of 9 August 1780.

The Spanish governor of Louisiana Bernardo de Gálvez launched several successful offensives against British Florida (1779–81), capturing the entirety of West Florida from Britain. Gálvez also conquered the island New Providence in the Bahamas. Jamaica was the last British stronghold of importance in the Caribbean. Gálvez attempted to organize an expedition to capture the island; however, the 1783 Peace of Paris was concluded and the invasion cancelled.

Under royal order from Charles III of Spain Gálvez continued the aid operations to supply the American rebels. The British blockaded the colonial ports of the Thirteen Colonies, and the route from Spanish-controlled New Orleans up to the Mississippi river was an effective alternative to supply the American rebels. Spain actively supported the thirteen colonies throughout the American Revolutionary War, beginning in 1776 by jointly funding Roderigue Hortalez and Company, a trading company that provided critical military supplies, throughout financing the final Siege of Yorktown in 1781 with a collection of gold and silver from Havana. Spanish aid was supplied to the colonies via four main routes: from French ports with the funding of Roderigue Hortalez and Company; through the port of New Orleans and up the Mississippi river; from warehouses in Havana; and (4)from the northwestern Spanish port of Bilbao, through the Gardoqui family trading company which supplied significant war materiel.

Contestation in Brazil

The majority of the territory of today's Brazil had been claimed as Spanish when exploration began with the navigation of the length of the Amazon River in 1541–42 by Francisco de Orellana. Many Spanish expeditions explored large parts of this vast region, especially those close to Spanish settlements. During the 16th and 17th centuries, Spanish soldiers, missionaries and adventurers also established pioneering communities, primarily in Paraná, Santa Catarina, and São Paulo, and forts on the northeastern coast threatened by the French and Dutch.

As Portuguese-Brazilian settlement expanded, following in the trail of the Bandeirantes exploits, these isolated Spanish groups were eventually integrated into Brazilian society. Only some Castilians who were displaced from the disputed areas of the Pampas of Rio Grande do Sul have left a significant influence on the formation of the gaucho, when they mixed with Indian groups, Portuguese and blacks who arrived in the region during the 18th century. The Spanish were barred by their laws from slaving of indigenous people, leaving them without a commercial interest deep in the interior of the Amazon basin. The Laws of Burgos (1512) and the New Laws (1542) had been intended to protect the interests of indigenous people. The Portuguese-Brazilian slavers, the Bandeirantes, had the advantage of access from the mouth of the Amazon River, which was on the Portuguese side of the line of Tordesillas. One famous attack upon a Spanish mission in 1628 resulted in the enslavement of about 60,000 indigenous people.

In time, there was in effect a self-funding force of occupation. By the 18th century, much of the Spanish territory was under de facto control of Portuguese-Brazil. This reality was recognized with the legal transfer of sovereignty in 1750 of most of the Amazon basin and surrounding areas to Portugal in the Treaty of Madrid. This settlement sowed the seeds of the Guaraní War in 1756.

Rival empires in the Pacific Northwest

Spain claimed all of North America in the Age of Discovery, but claims were not translated into occupation until a major resource was discovered and Spanish settlement and crown rule put in place. The French had established an empire in northern North America and took some islands in the Caribbean. The English established colonies on the eastern seaboard of North America and in northern North America and some Caribbean islands as well. In the eighteenth century, the Spanish crown realized that its territorial claims needed to be defended, particularly in the wake of its visible weakness during the Seven Years' War when Britain captured the important Spanish ports of Havana and Manila. Another important factor was that the Russian empire had expanded into North America from the mid-eighteenth century, with fur trading settlements in what is now Alaska and forts as far south as Fort Ross, California. Great Britain was also expanding into areas that Spain claimed as its territory on the Pacific coast. Taking steps to shore up its fragile claims to California, Spain began planning California missions in 1769. Spain also began a series of voyages to the Pacific Northwest, where Russia and Great Britain were encroaching on claimed territory. The Spanish expeditions to the Pacific Northwest, with Alessandro Malaspina and others sailing for Spain, came too late for Spain to assert its sovereignty in the Pacific Northwest.

The Nootka Crisis (1789–1791) nearly brought Spain and Britain to war. It was a dispute over claims in the Pacific Northwest, where neither nation had established permanent settlements. The crisis could have led to war, but without French support Spain capitulated to British terms and negotiations took place with the Nootka Convention. Spain and Great Britain agreed to not establish settlements and allowed free access to Nootka Sound on the west coast of what is now Vancouver Island. Nevertheless, the outcome of the crisis was a humiliation for Spain and a triumph for Britain, as Spain had practically renounced all sovereignty on the North Pacific coast.

In 1806, Baron Nikolai Rezanov attempted to negotiate a treaty between the Russian-American Company and the Viceroyalty of New Spain, but his unexpected death in 1807 ended any treaty hopes. Spain gave up its claims in the West of North America in the Adams-Onis Treaty of 1819, ceding its rights there to the United States, allowing the U.S. to purchase Florida, and establishing a boundary between New Spain and the U.S. When the negotiations between the two nations were taking place, Spain's resources were stretched due to the Spanish American wars of independence. Much of the present-day American Southwest later became part of Mexico after its independence from Spain; after the Mexican–American War, Mexico ceded to the U.S. present-day California, Texas, New Mexico, Utah, Nevada, Arizona, and parts of Colorado, Oklahoma, Kansas, Nebraska and Wyoming for $15 million.

Loss of Spanish Louisiana

The growth of trade and wealth in the colonies caused increasing political tensions as frustration grew with the improving but still restrictive trade with Spain. Alessandro Malaspina's recommendation to turn the empire into a looser confederation to help improve governance and trade so as to quell the growing political tensions between the élites of the empire's periphery and center was suppressed by a monarchy afraid of losing control. All was to be swept away by the tumult that was to overtake Europe at the turn of the 19th century with the French Revolutionary and Napoleonic Wars.

The first major territory Spain was to lose in the 19th century was the vast Louisiana Territory, which had few European settlers. It stretched north to Canada and was ceded by France in 1763 under the terms of the Treaty of Fontainebleau. The French, under Napoleon, took back possession as part of the Treaty of San Ildefonso in 1800 and sold it to the United States in the Louisiana Purchase of 1803. Napoleon's sale of the Louisiana Territory to the United States in 1803 caused border disputes between the United States and Spain that, with rebellions in West Florida (1810) and in the remainder of Louisiana at the mouth of the Mississippi, led to their eventual cession to the United States.

End of the global empire (1808–1899)

Destabilization of the empire (1808–1814)

Spain was caught up in European events of the Napoleonic era that led to its loss of empire in Spanish America. Spain was France's ally, but it had tried to avoid being drawn directly into the ongoing conflict between Napoleon's France and Britain. War broke out in 1804 after a British squadron captured a Spanish convoy off Cape Santa Maria, Portugal. The British navy defeated the Spanish navy in the Battle of Trafalgar in 1805. The following year, the British attempted to seize the Río de la Plata estuary. The viceroy retreated hastily inland when defeated by a small British force. However, the Criollos''' militias and colonial army repulsed the now reinforced British force in 1807.

In 1808, the Spanish king was tricked and Spain was taken over by Napoleon without firing a shot, but the French provoked a popular uprising from the Spanish people and the grinding guerrilla warfare, which Napoleon dubbed his "ulcer," the Peninsular War, (famously depicted by the painter Goya) ensued. Spain gave the Napoleonic army their first open-field defeat at the Battle of Bailén (July 1808), which inspired Austria and Britain to form the Fifth Coalition against France.

The Napoleonic invasion provoked a crisis of sovereignty and legitimacy to rule, a new political framework, and the loss of most of Spanish America. In Spain, political uncertainty lasted over a decade and turmoil for several decades, civil wars on succession disputes, a republic, and finally a liberal democracy. Resistance coalesced around juntas, emergency ad hoc governments. A Supreme Central Junta, ruling in the name of Ferdinand VII, was created on 25 September 1808 to coordinate efforts among the various juntas. Subsequently, a cortes or parliament was called, with representatives not only from Spain, but also Spanish America and the Philippines. In 1812, the Cortes of Cádiz drafted the Spanish Constitution of 1812. When Ferdinand VII was restored to the throne in 1814, he repudiated the constitution and re-asserted absolutist rule. A military coup in 1820 led by Rafael del Riego forced Ferdinand to accept the constitution again, which went back into force until Ferdinand raised troops in 1823, and re-asserted absolutist rule again. The reinstatement of the constitution was a major factor in propelling New Spain's elites to support independence in 1821.

 Spanish American conflicts and independence (1810–1833) 

The idea of a separate identity for Spanish America has been developed in the modern historical literature, but the idea of complete Spanish American independence from the Spanish Empire was not general at the time and political independence was not inevitable. Historian Brian Hamnett argues that had the Spanish monarchy and Spanish liberals been more flexible regarding the place of the overseas components, the empire would not have collapsed. Juntas emerged in Spanish America as Spain faced a political crisis due to the invasion and occupation by Napoleon Bonaparte and abdication of Ferdinand VII. Spanish Americans reacted in much the same way the Peninsular Spanish did, legitimizing their actions through traditional law, which held that sovereignty reverted to the people in the absence of a legitimate king.

The majority of Spanish Americans continued to support the idea of maintaining a monarchy, but did not support retaining absolute monarchy under Ferdinand VII. Spanish Americans wanted self-government. The juntas in the Americas did not accept the governments of the Europeans—neither the government set up for Spain by the French nor the various Spanish governments set up in response to the French invasion. The juntas did not accept the Spanish regency, isolated under siege in the city of Cadiz (1810–1812). They also rejected the Spanish Constitution of 1812 although the Constitution gave Spanish citizenship to those in the territories that had belonged to the Spanish monarchy in both hemispheres.
The liberal Spanish Constitution of 1812 recognized indigenous peoples of the Americas as Spanish citizens. But the acquisition of citizenship for any casta of Afro-American peoples of the Americas was through naturalization—excluding slaves.

A long period of wars followed in America, and the lack of Spanish troops in the colonies led to civil war between patriotic rebels and local Royalists. In South America this period of wars led to the independence of Argentina (1810), Venezuela (1810), Chile (1810), Paraguay (1811) and Uruguay (1815, but subsequently ruled by Brazil until 1828). José de San Martín campaigned for independence in Chile (1818) and in Peru (1821). Further north, Simón Bolívar led forces that won independence between 1811 and 1826 for the area that became Venezuela, Colombia, Ecuador, Perú and Bolivia (then Alto Perú). Panama declared independence in 1821 and merged with the Republic of Gran Colombia (from 1821 to 1903).

In the Viceroyalty of New Spain, Miguel Hidalgo wanted freedom and liberty for Mexico in 1810 in the Grito de Dolores. Independence was actually won in 1821 by a royalist army officer turned insurgent, Agustín de Iturbide, in alliance with insurgent Vicente Guerrero and under the Plan of Iguala. The conservative Catholic hierarchy in New Spain supported Mexican independence largely because it found the liberal Spanish Constitution of 1812 abhorrent. Central America provinces became independent via Mexico's independence in 1821 and joined Mexico for a brief time (1822–23), but they chose their own path when Mexico became a republic in 1824.

The Spanish coastal fortifications in Veracruz, Callao and Chiloé were the footholds that resisted until 1825 and 1826 respectively. In Spanish America, Royalist guerrillas continued the war in several countries, and Spain launched attempts to retake Venezuela in 1823 and Mexico in 1829. Spain abandoned all plans of military re-conquest at the death of King Ferdinand VII in 1833. Finally the Spanish government went so far as to renounce sovereignty over all of continental America in 1836.

Santo Domingo and Cuba
Santo Domingo (which had previously gone to war against the French to restore Spanish rule) likewise declared independence in 1821 and began negotiating for inclusion in Bolivar's Republic of Gran Colombia, but was quickly occupied by the former French colony of Haiti, which ruled it until an 1844 revolution. After 17 years of independence, in 1861, Santo Domingo was again made a Spanish colony due to Haitian aggression. It was the only time that a Spanish colonial possession would return to Spain after having gained independence.

By 1862, Spain was contending with a limited insurgency and losing hundreds of soldiers. A major uprising broke out in August 1863, motivated by the Spanish government's attempts to impose strict Catholicism and the Castilianization of most government and military positions. In September 1863, the besieged Spanish garrison of Santiago abandoned the city and marched to Puerto Plata, harassed by Dominicans all the way. There they joined the garrison in the fort, leaving the city to be pillaged by the rebels. Eventually six hundred Spanish sallied out, and after a severe fight, drove off the rebels with help from the cannon of the fort, but by then the city had been plundered and burnt almost out of existence. The damage to Santiago and Puerto Plata was estimated at $5,000,000.

During the Dominican Restoration War, the rebel leadership had changed frequently, only to be deposed in coups for corruption, politics or in the case of Gaspar Polanco (who lasted three months) leading a disastrous direct attack on the Spanish at Monte Cristi in December 1864. Thus by the end of 1864, it could be said the Spanish were winning. However, military victory was trumped by political defeat. The price of war in terms of money and lives had been huge, disease and the hardy guerrilla fighters of the island causing many casualties that Spain could ill afford, and in 1865, the Bourbon Queen Isabella II signed a decree annulling the annexation.

A few years later, the Ten Years' War (1868–78) would begin in Cuba. The Virginius Affair (31 October 1873), in which Spanish naval forces seized a filibustering ship flying the U.S. flag off Jamaica and executed more than fifty of its officers, crew, and passengers, seriously strained relations with the United States, but U.S. intervention in Cuba was averted by the diplomatic pressure of Britain. The Cubans defeated the Spanish in several battles, most notably at the Battle of Las Guasimas in 1874, but Cuba's first war of independence ended inconclusively. Both sides sustained heavy casualties and the island sustained over $300 million in property damage. After the Cuban War of Independence broke out in 1895, Spain sent more than two hundred thousand soldiers to Cuba, the largest army ever to cross the Atlantic until World War II. Spanish atrocities in Cuba and the sinking of an American battleship in Havana Harbor caused the U.S. to declare war on Spain in April 1898.

Philippine Revolution

The Philippine Revolution began in August 1896, when the Spanish authorities discovered the Katipunan, an anti-colonial secret organization. The Katipunan, led by Andrés Bonifacio, began to influence much of the Philippines. During a mass gathering in Caloocan, the leaders of the Katipunan organized  into a revolutionary government, named the newly established government "Haring Bayang Katagalugan", and openly declared a nationwide armed revolution. Bonifacio called for an attack on the capital city of Manila. This attack failed; however, the surrounding provinces began to revolt. In particular, rebels in Cavite led by Mariano Álvarez and Baldomero Aguinaldo (who were leaders from two different factions of the Katipunan) won early major victories. A power struggle among the revolutionaries led to a schism among Katipunan leadership followed by Bonifacio's execution in 1897. With command having shifted to Emilio Aguinaldo, who led the newly formed revolutionary government. That year, revolutionaries and the Spanish signed the Pact of Biak-na-Bato, which temporarily reduced hostilities. Filipino revolutionary officers exiled themselves to Hong Kong. However, the hostilities never completely ceased.

This was the first military action of the Spanish–American War of 1898. On May 1, the U.S. Navy's Asiatic Squadron, under Commodore George Dewey, decisively defeated the Spanish Navy in the Battle of Manila Bay, effectively seizing control of Manila. On May 19, Aguinaldo, unofficially allied with the United States, returned to the Philippines and resumed attacks against the Spaniards. By June, the rebels had gained control of nearly all of the Philippines, with the exception of Manila. On June 12, Aguinaldo issued the Philippine Declaration of Independence. Although this signified the end date of the revolution, neither Spain nor the United States recognized Philippine independence.

The Spanish rule of the Philippines officially ended with the Treaty of Paris of 1898, which also ended the Spanish–American War. In the treaty, Spain ceded control of the Philippines and other territories to the United States. There was an uneasy peace around Manila, with the American forces controlling the city and the weaker Philippines forces surrounding them.

On February 4, 1899, in the Battle of Manila, fighting broke out between the Filipino and American forces, beginning the Philippine–American War. Aguinaldo immediately ordered "[t]hat peace and friendly relations with the Americans be broken and that the latter be treated as enemies". In June 1899, the nascent First Philippine Republic formally declared war against the United States.

Spanish–American War

The uprisings in Cuba and the Philippine Islands culminated with the Spanish–American War of 1898. On 1 May, the American navy destroyed the Spanish Pacific fleet at the Battle of Manila Bay in the first battle of the Spanish–American War. The Battle of Las Guasimas, Battle of El Caney, and Battle of San Juan Hill were counted as American victories but saw the Spanish Army inflict heavier casualties. After isolating and defeating the Spanish garrisons in Cuba, the American navy destroyed the Spanish Caribbean fleet on 3 July at the Battle of Santiago de Cuba. A more modern Spanish fleet, which had been sent to try and recover Manila, was recalled to protect the Spanish coasts from a possible American attack. Thus ended any Spanish attempt to recapture or even to protect its colonies.

Military defeat was followed by the U.S. occupation of Cuba and the cession of Puerto Rico, Guam, and the Philippines to the United States, receiving US$20 million in compensation for the Philippines. The following year, Spain then sold its remaining Pacific Ocean possessions to Germany in the German–Spanish Treaty, retaining only its African territories. On 2 June 1899, the second expeditionary battalion Cazadores of Philippines, the last Spanish garrison in the Philippines, which had been besieged in Baler, Aurora at war's end, was pulled out, effectively ending around 300 years of Spanish hegemony in the archipelago.

Philippine–American War

The Philippine–American War or Filipino–American War, previously referred to as the Philippine Insurrection or the Tagalog Insurgency by the United States, was an armed conflict between the First Philippine Republic and the United States that started on February 4, 1899, and ended on July 2, 1902. The conflict arose in 1898 when the United States, rather than acknowledging the Philippines' declaration of independence, annexed the Philippines under the Treaty of Paris at the conclusion of the Spanish–American War. The war can be seen as a continuation of the Philippine struggle for independence that began in 1896 with the Philippine Revolution against Spanish rule.

Fighting erupted between forces of the United States and those of the Philippine Republic on February 4, 1899, in what became known as the 1899 Battle of Manila. On June 2, 1899, the First Philippine Republic officially declared war against the United States. The Philippine President Emilio Aguinaldo was captured on March 23, 1901, and the war was officially declared ended by the American government on July 2, 1902, with a victory for the United States. However, some Philippine groups—some led by veterans of the Katipunan, a Philippine revolutionary society that had launched the revolution against Spain—continued to battle the American forces for several more years. Among those leaders was Macario Sakay, a veteran Katipunan member who established (or re-established) the Tagalog Republic in 1902 along Katipunan lines in contrast to Aguinaldo's Republic, with himself as president. Other groups, including the Muslim Moro peoples of the southern Philippines and quasi-Catholic Pulahan religious movements, continued hostilities in remote areas. The resistance in the Moro-dominated provinces in the south, called the Moro Rebellion by the Americans, ended with their final defeat at the Battle of Bud Bagsak on June 15, 1913. The war resulted in at least 200,000 Filipino civilian deaths, mostly due to famine and disease. Some estimates for total civilian dead reach up to a million.

 Territories in Africa (1885–1975) 

By the end of the 17th century, only Melilla, Alhucemas, Peñón de Vélez de la Gomera (which had been taken again in 1564), Ceuta (part of the Portuguese Empire since 1415, had chosen to retain its links to Spain once the Iberian Union ended; the formal allegiance of Ceuta to Spain was recognized by the Treaty of Lisbon in 1668), Oran and Mers El Kébir remained as Spanish territory in Africa. The latter cities were lost in 1708, reconquered in 1732 and sold by Charles IV in 1792.

In 1778, Fernando Poo Island (now Bioko), adjacent islets, and commercial rights to the mainland between the Niger and Ogooué Rivers were ceded to Spain by the Portuguese in exchange for territory in South America (Treaty of El Pardo). In the 19th century, some Spanish explorers and missionaries would cross this zone, among them Manuel Iradier.

In 1848, Spanish troops occupied the uninhabited Chafarinas Islands, anticipating a French move on the rocks located off the North-African coast.

In 1860, after the Tetuan War, Morocco paid Spain 100 million pesetas as war reparations and ceded Sidi Ifni to Spain as a part of the Treaty of Tangiers, on the basis of the old outpost of Santa Cruz de la Mar Pequeña, thought to be Sidi Ifni. The following decades of Franco-Spanish collaboration resulted in the establishment and extension of Spanish protectorates south of the city, and Spanish influence obtained international recognition in the Berlin Conference of 1884: Spain administered Sidi Ifni and Western Sahara jointly. Spain claimed a protectorate over the coast of Guinea from Cape Bojador to Cap Blanc, too, and even try to press a claim over the Adrar and Tiris regions in Mauritania. Río Muni became a protectorate in 1885 and a colony in 1900. Conflicting claims to the Guinea mainland were settled in 1900 by the Treaty of Paris, because of which Spain was left with a mere 26,000 km2 out of the 300,000 stretching east to the Ubangi River which they initially claimed. 

Following a brief war in 1893, Morocco paid war reparations of 20 million pesetas and Spain expanded its influence south from Melilla. In 1911, Morocco was divided between the French and Spanish. The Riffians rebelled, led by Abdelkrim, a former officer for the Spanish administration. The Battle of Annual (1921) during the Rif War was a major military defeat suffered by the Spanish army against Moroccan insurgents. A leading Spanish politician emphatically declared: "We are at the most acute period of Spanish decadence". After the disaster of Annual, Spain began using German chemical weapons against the Moroccans. In September 1925, the Alhucemas landing by the Spanish Army and Navy with a small collaboration of an allied French contingent put an end to the Rif War. It is considered the first successful amphibious landing in history supported by seaborne air power and tanks.

In 1923, Tangier was declared an international city under French, Spanish, British, and later Italian joint administration.

In 1926 Bioko and Rio Muni were united as the colony of Spanish Guinea, a status that would last until 1959. In 1931, following the fall of the monarchy, the African colonies became part of the Second Spanish Republic. In 1934, during the government of Prime Minister Alejandro Lerroux, Spanish troops led by General Osvaldo Capaz landed in Sidi Ifni and carried out the occupation of the territory, ceded de jure by Morocco in 1860. Two years later, Francisco Franco, a general of the Army of Africa, rebelled against the republican government and started the Spanish Civil War (1936–39). During the Second World War the Vichy French presence in Tangier was overcome by that of Francoist Spain.

Spain lacked the wealth and the interest to develop an extensive economic infrastructure in its African colonies during the first half of the 20th century. However, through a paternalistic system, particularly on Bioko Island, Spain developed large cocoa plantations for which thousands of Nigerian workers were imported as laborers.

In 1956, when French Morocco became independent, Spain surrendered Spanish Morocco to the new nation, but retained control of Sidi Ifni, the Tarfaya region and Spanish Sahara. Moroccan Sultan (later King) Mohammed V was interested in these territories and unsuccessfully invaded Spanish Sahara in 1957, in the Ifni War, or in Spain, the Forgotten War. In 1958, Spain ceded Tarfaya to Mohammed V and joined the previously separate districts of Saguia el-Hamra (in the north) and Río de Oro (in the south) to form the province of Spanish Sahara.

In 1959, the Spanish territory on the Gulf of Guinea was established with a status similar to the provinces of metropolitan Spain. As the Spanish Equatorial Region, it was ruled by a governor general exercising military and civilian powers. The first local elections were held in 1959, and the first Equatoguinean representatives were seated in the Spanish parliament. Under the Basic Law of December 1963, limited autonomy was authorized under a joint legislative body for the territory's two provinces. The name of the country was changed to Equatorial Guinea. In March 1968, under pressure from Equatoguinean nationalists and the United Nations, Spain announced that it would grant the country independence.

In 1969, under international pressure, Spain returned Sidi Ifni to Morocco. Spanish control of Spanish Sahara endured until the 1975 Green March prompted a withdrawal, under Moroccan military pressure. The future of this former Spanish colony remains uncertain.

The Canary Islands and Spanish cities in the African mainland are considered an equal part of Spain and the European Union but have a different tax system.

Morocco still claims Ceuta, Melilla, and  even though they are internationally recognized as administrative divisions of Spain. Isla Perejil was occupied on 11 July 2002 by Moroccan Gendarmerie and troops, who were evicted by Spanish naval forces in a bloodless operation.

Legacy

Although the Spanish Empire declined from its apogee in the late seventeenth century, it remained a wonder for other Europeans for its sheer geographical span. Writing in 1738, English author Samuel Johnson questioned, "Has heaven reserved, in pity to the poor,/No pathless waste or undiscovered shore,/No secret island in the boundless main,/No peaceful desert yet unclaimed by Spain?"

The Spanish Empire left a huge linguistic, religious, political, cultural, and urban architectural legacy in the Western Hemisphere. With over 470 million native speakers today, Spanish is the second most spoken native language in the world, as result of the introduction of the language of Castile—Castilian, "Castellano" —from Iberia to Spanish America, later expanded by the governments of successor independent republics. In the Philippines, the Spanish–American War (1898) brought the islands under U.S. jurisdiction, with English being imposed in schools and Spanish becoming a secondary official language. Many indigenous languages throughout the empire were often lost either as indigenous populations were decimated by war and disease, or as indigenous people mixed with colonists, and the Spanish language was taught and spread over time.

An important cultural legacy of the Spanish empire overseas is Roman Catholicism, which remains the main religious faith in Spanish America and the Philippines. Christian evangelization of indigenous peoples was a key responsibility of the crown and a justification for its imperial expansion. Although indigenous were considered neophytes and insufficiently mature in their faith for indigenous men to be ordained to the priesthood, the indigenous were part of the Catholic community of faith. Catholic orthodoxy was enforced by the Inquisition, particularly targeting crypto-Jews and Protestants. Not until after their independence in the nineteenth century did Spanish American republics allow religious toleration of other faiths. Observances of Catholic holidays often have strong regional expressions and remain important in many parts of Spanish America. Observances include Day of the Dead, Carnival, Holy Week, Corpus Christi, Epiphany, and national saints' days, such as the Virgin of Guadalupe in Mexico.

Politically, the colonial era has strongly influenced modern Spanish America. The territorial divisions of the empire in Spanish America became the basis for boundaries between new republics after independence and for state divisions within countries. It is often argued that the rise of caudillismo during and after Latin American independence movements created a legacy of authoritarianism in the region. There was no significant development of representative institutions during the colonial era, and the executive power was often made stronger than the legislative power during the national period as a result.

Unfortunately, this has led to a popular misconception that the colonial legacy has caused the region to have an extremely oppressed proletariat. Revolts and riots are often seen as evidence of this supposed extreme oppression. However, the culture of revolting against an unpopular government is not simply a confirmation of widespread authoritarianism. The colonial legacy did leave a political culture of revolt, but not always as a desperate last act. The civil unrest of the region is seen by some as a form of political involvement. While the political context of the political revolutions in Spanish America is understood to be one in which liberal elites competed to form new national political structures, so too were those elites responding to mass lower-class political mobilization and participation.

Hundreds of towns and cities in the Americas were founded during the Spanish rule, with the colonial centers and buildings of many of them now designated as UNESCO World Heritage Sites attracting tourists. The tangible heritage includes universities, forts, cities, cathedrals, schools, hospitals, missions, government buildings and colonial residences, many of which still stand today. A number of present-day roads, canals, ports or bridges sit where Spanish engineers built them centuries ago. The oldest universities in the Americas were founded by Spanish scholars and Catholic missionaries. The Spanish Empire also left a vast cultural and linguistic legacy. The cultural legacy is also present in the music, cuisine, and fashion, some of which have been granted the status of UNESCO Intangible Cultural Heritage.

The long colonial period in Spanish America resulted in a mixing of indigenous peoples, Europeans, and Africans that were classified by race and hierarchically ranked, which created a markedly different society than the European colonies of North America. In concert with the Portuguese, the Spanish Empire laid the foundations of a truly global trade by opening up the great trans-oceanic trade routes and the exploration of unknown territories and oceans for the western knowledge. The Spanish dollar became the world's first global currency.

One of the features of this trade was the exchange of a great array of domesticated plants and animals between the Old World and the New in the Columbian Exchange. Some cultivars that were introduced to America included grapes, wheat, barley, apples and citrous fruits; animals that were introduced to the New World were horses, donkeys, cattle, sheep, goats, pigs, and chickens. The Old World received from America such things as maize, potatoes, chili peppers, tomatoes, tobacco, beans, squash, cacao (chocolate), vanilla, avocados, pineapples, chewing gum, rubber, peanuts, cashews, Brazil nuts, pecans, blueberries, strawberries, quinoa, amaranth, chia, agave and others. The result of these exchanges was to significantly improve the agricultural potential of not only in America, but also that of Europe and Asia. Diseases brought by Europeans and Africans, such as smallpox, measles, typhus, and others, devastated almost all indigenous populations that had no immunity.

There were also cultural influences, which can be seen in everything from architecture to food, music, art and law, from Southern Argentina and Chile to the United States of America together with the Philippines. The complex origins and contacts of different peoples resulted in cultural influences coming together in the varied forms evident today in the former colonial areas.

Gallery

 See also 

 Black legend (Spain)
 Cartography of Latin America
 Colonialism
 Creole nationalism
 Governor-General of the Philippines
 Historiography of Colonial Spanish America
 History of Spain
 History of the Americas
 List of countries that gained independence from Spain
 List of oldest buildings in the Americas
 Society in the Spanish Colonial Americas
 Spain
 Columbian Viceroyalty
 Las Islas Filipinas
 Spain in the 17th century
 Spain in the 18th century
 Spanish North Africa (disambiguation)
 Spanish West Africa
 Spanish West Indies
 Spanish Colonial architecture
 Spanish Viceroys of Aragon
 Spanish Viceroys of Catalonia
 Spanish Viceroys of Naples
 Spanish Viceroys of Navarre
 Spanish Viceroys of Sardinia
 Spanish Viceroys of Sicily
 Spanish Viceroys of Valencia
 Viceroys of New Granada
 Viceroys of New Spain
 Viceroys of Peru
 Viceroys of Río de la Plata

References
Notes

 Citations 

Bibliography

 
 
 
 
 
 
 
 
 
 
 
 
 
 
 
 
 
 
 
 
 
 
  5 volumes
 
 
 
 

 
 
 
 
 
 
 
 
 
 
 
 
 
 
 
 
 
 
 
 

 Further reading 

 
 
 
 
  
 
 
 
 
 
 
 
 
  
 
 Kamen, Henry. Empire: How Spain Became a World Power, 1493–1763''. New York: HarperCollins 2003.

External links 

 Library of Iberian Resources Online, Stanley G Payne A History of Spain and Portugal vol 1 Ch 13 "The Spanish Empire"
 The Mestizo-Mexicano-Indian History in the USA
 Documentary Film, Villa de Albuquerque
 The last Spanish colonies 
 
 The Kraus Collection of Sir Francis Drake at the Library of Congress contains primary materials on Spanish colonialism.

 
States and territories established in 1492
States and territories disestablished in 1976
Christian states
Former empires
History of European colonialism
Spain
Overseas empires
Spanish colonization of the Americas
.
.
.
2nd millennium in Spain
Historical transcontinental empires